Empire Records is a 1995 American coming-of-age comedy-drama film directed by Allan Moyle, starring Anthony LaPaglia, Maxwell Caulfield, Debi Mazar, Rory Cochrane, Johnny Whitworth, Robin Tunney, Renée Zellweger, and Liv Tyler. The film follows a group of record store employees over the course of one exceptional day. The employees try to stop the store from being sold to a large chain, and learn about each other along the way. The film generated negative reviews and major losses at the domestic US box office at its release. It went on to become a cult hit, and several of its stars launched successful careers.

Plot

At independent record store Empire Records in Delaware, employee Lucas has been tasked by store manager Joe with closing the store for the first time. While counting the day's receipts in Joe's office, he discovers the store is about to be sold and converted into a branch of Music Town, a large national chain.

Determined to keep the store independent, Lucas hatches a plan, taking the day's cash receipts of approximately $9,000 to a casino in Atlantic City to quadruple it playing craps. Though successfully doubling the money on his first roll, he loses everything on the second.

The following morning, fellow Empire employees A.J. and Mark find Lucas, who confides in them about the previous night's events, just before riding off on his motorcycle. Joe arrives and quickly receives frantic phone calls about the missing deposit from both the bank and the store's owner, Mitchell Beck.

Other employees arrive, including overachieving high school student Corey and her uninhibited best friend Gina. Hostile employee Deb, who has survived an apparent suicide attempt, also arrives. Deb then goes into the bathroom and shaves her head.  Upon Lucas' arrival, Joe confronts him about the missing deposit, and Lucas confirms the money was lost. Joe explains his anti-Music Town plan to the employees – he had saved enough money to become part-owner of the store to save it, but will now be $9,000 short as he must cover the missing money with Mitchell.

Joe is distracted from the crisis due to a major store event: Rex Manning Day. The washed-up 1980s pop idol is holding an autograph session at the store for fans of his latest album Back with More. The unenthused staff mock both Manning and the event, and ultimately many of the fans showing up to meet him are either older women or gay men.

Though detained by Joe in his office, Lucas nonetheless apprehends a belligerent young shoplifter who identifies himself only as "Warren Beatty". He is taken away by police but vows to return seeking revenge. Encouraged by Gina, Corey indulges her schoolgirl crush on Manning by attempting to seduce him, but winds up humiliated and dejected; A.J. then chooses this inopportune time to confess his love to Corey, which she rejects. After Gina and Corey argue, Gina has sex with Manning. When the staff discover this, A.J. attacks Manning, Gina reveals Corey's addiction to amphetamines, Corey hysterically trashes the store, and Joe tells Manning to leave.

Deb surprisingly attempts to cheer Corey up, and in return she holds a mock funeral for Deb with the whole staff. The shoplifter "Warren" returns with a gun (ultimately loaded with blanks), and Lucas defuses the situation by revealing that he himself was a troubled youth until he was taken in and saved by Joe. He in turn offers "Warren" a job at the store.

After the police leave, Lucas admits defeat, and suggests confessing the truth about the missing money to Mitchell. However, the staff try to replace the missing money but can raise only $3,000. Suddenly inspired, Mark runs in front of the news crew covering the holdup, announcing on live TV a late-night benefit party at the store to "Save the Empire". An impromptu concert on the roof by Gina and Berko, another employee, raises funds so Joe can hand the money raised to Mitchell to buy the store.

Corey finally finds a dejected A.J. on the roof fixing the Empire Records sign, and confesses that she loves him too. He decides to attend art school in Boston to be near her while she attends Harvard. They kiss, and the staff ends the long day with a dance party on the roof.

Cast

Production
New Regency got into a bidding war with Warner Bros. over the script. Carol Heikkinen was offered $325,000 up-front and $200,000 if the film was made. Heikkinen was also to receive 1% of any soundtrack royalties and 5% of merchandise sales.
Heikkinen based the film on her time working in Tower Records store #166 (Christown Mall) in Phoenix, Arizona. Tower Records went into bankruptcy, and all Tower stores in the U.S. were closed by 2006.

Two days after Regency Enterprises executive Michael Nathanson gave approval to proceed with making Empire Records, he was approached with the script for Clueless. As he already had a "teen movie" in hand, he turned down the eventual $57 million box office hit, and proceeded with production of the eventual $0.3 million box-office bomb of Empire Records.

The film was severely edited in post-production, removing three significant characters and up to 40 minutes of film. The story was also condensed from occurring over two days to a single day.

Exteriors were filmed at 15 South Front Street in Wilmington, North Carolina, in a bar that had a few feet of space converted into a replica of the store set which was located at Carolco (now Screen Gems) studios, and finished with a large picture of the rest of the store. This allowed the actors to enter the exterior location doors and walk a couple of feet before the scene would cut to the interior set on Soundstage 4 at the studio. The large mural of Gloria Estefan which Mark kisses early in the film was visible for many years on the separate building, on South Water Street, that stood in for the back of the store.

The Rex Manning music video "Say No More, Mon Amour" was shot prior to principal photography, and was shot on Wrightsville Beach in North Carolina in one day. It was intended to be only a 17-second dance move piece for the main actors to make fun of in the film. Jordan Dawes, the director of the music video, shot for the entire day and gave the producers a complete music video that was almost five minutes in length.

Reception

Box office
The film was a severe flop, making only $150,800 in its opening weekend, and by the end of its run in North America it earned a total of $303,841 against its $10 million budget.

Critical response
On Rotten Tomatoes the film has an approval rating of 31% based on reviews from 35 critics. The site's consensus is: "Despite a terrific soundtrack and a strong early performance from Renee Zellweger, Empire Records is mostly a silly and predictable teen dramedy." On Metacritic the film has a score of 30% based on reviews from 7 critics, indicating "generally unfavorable reviews".

Variety called Empire Records a "soundtrack in search of a movie", describing the film as "one teen-music effort that never finds a groove" before adding that "as far as chart action goes, it could use a bullet -- to put it out of its B.O. misery." TV Guide gave the film 2 stars out of 5, calling it a "lame comedy" that appeared to be little more than "an elaborate excuse to package and peddle a soundtrack CD."
Roger Ebert called the film a "lost cause", but wrote that some of the actors might have a future in other, better films. LaPaglia, Cochrane, Zellweger, Tyler, Embry and Tunney all went on to varying levels of success in the years following Empire Records.

Caroline Westbrook of Empire magazine, gave it 3 out of 5, saying "For all its faults, the good-natured, quirky humour that this for the most part offers ultimately makes it very hard to dislike." Ty Burr of Entertainment Weekly called it "too blatant a throwback to crass '80s teen fodder to really work."

Music

Background
The soundtrack album for Empire Records was originally attached to Atlantic Records—an affiliate of Warner Bros. at the time—because Warner Bros. had a distribution pact with the film's producers, Regency Enterprises. However, the soundtrack album was given to A&M Records in order to obtain the participation of A&M artists the Gin Blossoms, whose track "Til I Hear It from You" was issued as the lead single. Besides the Gin Blossoms, four other A&M acts had new tracks released on the soundtrack album: Ape Hangers, Drill, Innocence Mission, and Lustre.

The album also introduced tracks by Better Than Ezra, Cracker, the Cranberries, Evan Dando (whose cover of Big Star's "The Ballad of El Goodo" featured Empire Records female lead Liv Tyler on background vocals), and Toad The Wet Sprocket, and by unsigned acts the Martinis, Please, and Coyote Shivers. The Martinis—featuring former Pixies members Joey Santiago and Dave Lovering—were recommended by Hits magazine president Karen Glauber who was musical consultant for Empire Records, while the film's line music supervisor Bob Knickman discovered Please by searching the internet for unsigned talent suitable for the film's soundtrack. Coyote Shivers, who played aspiring-musician-turned-store-clerk Berko in the film, became involved in the project by virtue of being the stepfather of Liv Tyler (Shivers being married to Tyler's mother, Bebe Buell, at the time).

Two previously released tracks were also included on the original release of the Empire Records soundtrack album: "A Girl Like You" by Edwyn Collins and "Ready, Steady, Go" by the Meices (the latter's frontman Joe Reineke subsequently led Alien Crime Syndicate). "The Honeymoon Is Over" by the Cruel Sea, a track heard in the film but not featured on the US release of the soundtrack album, was included on the German and Australian releases.

The Gin Blossoms' "Til I Hear It From You" charted as high as #9, affording the band their first Top 20 hit. Two other tracks from the album had a single release: Edwyn Collins' "A Girl Like You", which charted at #32, and the Ape Hangers' "I Don't Want to Live Today".

The version of the song "Sugarhigh" that appears in the movie differs significantly from the one included on the soundtrack. The film version has additional lyrics and chorus vocals provided by Renée Zellweger. It was intended only as a rough mix for playback during filming but was included on the soundtrack album because a remastered version was not available. Francis "Coyote" Shivers, the artist who released the song, played the lead singer who performed the song on the rooftop of the store at the end of the movie.

The Empire Records soundtrack peaked at No. 63 on the Billboard 200 album chart.

AllMusic.com rated the soundtrack 4 out of 5.

In 2010, Gin Blossoms frontman Robin Wilson said of Empire Records, "[It's] a classic film that only a handful of people really saw, but it definitely made an impact on that generation. It was really cool to have been a part of that".

Soundtrack 
 "Til I Hear It from You" by Gin Blossoms
 "Liar" by The Cranberries
 "A Girl Like You" by Edwyn Collins
 "Free" by The Martinis
 "Crazy Life" by Toad the Wet Sprocket
 "Bright As Yellow" by The Innocence Mission
 "Circle of Friends" by Better Than Ezra
 "I Don't Want to Live Today" by Ape Hangers
 "Whole Lotta Trouble" by Cracker
 "Ready, Steady, Go" by The Meices
 "What You Are" by Drill
 "Nice Overalls" by Lustre
 "Here It Comes Again" by Please
 "The Ballad of El Goodo" by Evan Dando
 "Sugarhigh" by Coyote Shivers
 "The Honeymoon Is Over" by The Cruel Sea

Other songs

 "Can't Stop Losing Myself" by Dirt Clods
 "Hey Joe" by Dirt Clods
 "Dark and Brooding" by Noah Stone
 "Thorn in My Side" by Quicksand
 "Little Bastard" by Ass Ponys (as Ass Ponies)
 "I Don't Know Why" by Sacrilicious
 "Real" by Real
 "If You Want Blood (You've Got It)" by AC/DC
 "Counting Blue Cars" by Dishwalla
 "Snakeface" by Throwing Muses
 "Candy" by Full Tilt Gonzo
 "How" by The Cranberries
 "Hardlight" by Pegboy
 "Chew Toy" by Fig Dish
 "Power Shack" by Fitz of Depression
 "Saddam A Go-Go" by Gwar
 "Back Down Blues" by Loose Diamonds
 "Tomorrow" by Mouth Music
 "Plowed" by Sponge
 "Surround You" by Billy White Trio
 "L.A. Girl" by Adolescents
 "Vinyl Advice" by Dead Hot Workshop
 "This Is the Day" by The The
 "Say No More (Mon Amour)" by Maxwell Caulfield as Rex Manning (written for the film)
 "She Walks" by Poster Children
 "Sorry" by Sybil Vane
 "Infinity" by Mouth Music
 "Money (That's What I Want)" by Flying Lizards 
 "Sugar High (ft. Renee Zellweger)" by Coyote Shivers
 "Seems" by Queen Sarah Saturday
 "Romeo and Juliet" by Dire Straits
 "Video Killed the Radio Star" by The Buggles
 "I Shot the Devil" by Suicidal Tendencies
 "Smooth Up In Ya" by Bulletboys
 "Rock 'n' Roll/EGA" by Daniel Johnston

Home media
On June 3, 2003 Warner Bros. released the Remix: Special Fan Edition DVD of Empire Records. The unrated version is 107 minutes long and includes four extra scenes and 17 minutes of additional footage.

For the 2015 Blu-ray release from the film's new owner 20th Century Fox, only the theatrical cut has been included, with the extras ported over from the 2003 "Remix! Special Fan Edition" DVD.

Legacy
An Internet meme among the film's fans celebrates "Rex Manning Day" on April 8, the date Rex appears at Empire Records in the film. #RexManningDay is a recurring trending hashtag on Twitter. GIFs commemorating the event show Embry's character bounding down the stairs from the store's loft, declaring "Not on Rex Manning Day!!"

Musical adaptation
It was announced on April 6, 2018 that a musical adaptation of the movie was aiming for Broadway in 2020. The announcement stated that the show would be produced by Bill Weiner; music and lyrics by Zoe Sarnak and book by Carol Heikkinen, but it was put on hold due to the COVID-19 pandemic.

References

External links

 
 
 

1995 films
1995 comedy-drama films
1995 independent films
1990s coming-of-age comedy-drama films
1990s romantic comedy-drama films
1990s teen comedy-drama films
1990s teen romance films
American coming-of-age comedy-drama films
American independent films
American romantic comedy-drama films
American teen comedy-drama films
American teen romance films
Coming-of-age romance films
1990s English-language films
Films about drugs
Films directed by Allan Moyle
Films set in Delaware
Films shot in Atlantic City, New Jersey
Films shot in North Carolina
Regency Enterprises films
Workplace comedy films
Films produced by Arnon Milchan
1990s American films
Films set in Atlantic City, New Jersey